Leptogastrinae is a subfamily of robber flies in the family Asilidae. There are more than 450 described species in Leptogastrinae.

Genera

 Acronyches Williston, 1908
 Ammophilomima Enderlein, 1914
 Apachekolos Martin, 1957
 Beameromyia Martin, 1957
 Eurhabdus Aldrich, 1923
 Euscelidia Westwood, 1850
 Lagynogaster Hermann, 1917
 Lasiocnemus Loew, 1851
 Leptogaster Meigen, 1803
 Leptopteromyia Williston, 1907
 Lobus Martin, 1972
 Mesoleptogaster Frey, 1937
 Ophionomima Enderlein, 1914
 Psilonyx Aldrich, 1923
 Schildia Aldrich, 1923
 Sinopsilonyx Hsia, 1949
 Systologaster Papavero, 2009
 Tipulogaster Cockerell, 1913
 † Cretagaster Dikow and Grimaldi, 2014

References

Further reading

External links

 

Asilidae
Brachycera subfamilies